Laton Alton Huffman (October 31, 1854 – February 28, 1931) was an American photographer of Frontier and Native American life. Born in Winneshiek County, Iowa, he spent most of his life photographing the area around his Montana home. Having initially worked at Fort Keogh, he started to sell prints of his glass plate negatives. In 1976, he was inducted into the Hall of Great Westerners of the National Cowboy & Western Heritage Museum.

Publications with contributions by Huffman
The Frontier Years: L.A. Huffman, Photographer of the Plains. New York: Henry Holt, 1955. 
Before Barbed Wire.
L.A. Huffman: Photographer of the American West. By Larry Len Peterson and with photographs by Huffman.
Missoula, MT: Mountain Press, 2005.
Missoula, MT: Mountain Press, 2013. . Revised third edition.
The Collotypes of L.A. Huffman: Montana Frontier Photographer. Helena, MT: Riverbend, 2014. . By Gene and Bev Allen and with photographs by Huffman.

Collections
Huffman's work is held in the following public collections:
J. Paul Getty Museum, Los Angeles, CA.
San Francisco Museum of Modern Art, San Francisco, CA: 1 print (as of November 2018)
Art Institute of Chicago, Chicago, IL: 22 prints (acquired 1975)

References

External links

Fan website by Gene and Bev Allen

Photographers from Iowa
People from Winneshiek County, Iowa
1854 births
1931 deaths
19th-century American photographers
19th-century male artists
20th-century American photographers
20th-century American male artists
19th-century American male artists